Øyposten (The Island Post) is a local Norwegian newspaper published in the municipality of Finnøy in Rogaland county. The newspaper was established in 1970 as a municipal newsletter, and it became an independent newspaper in 1999. Its offices are located in Judaberg. The paper is published in Nynorsk and it is edited by Jon Asgaut Flesjå.

Circulation
According to the Norwegian Audit Bureau of Circulations and National Association of Local Newspapers, Øyposten has had the following annual circulation:
2004: 1,157
2005: 1,157
2006: 1,191
2007: 1,254
2008: 1,312
2009: 1,390
2010: 1,458
2011: 1,430
2012: 1,462
2013: 1,429
2014: 1,391
2015: 1,381
2016: 1,323

References

External links
Øyposten homepage

Newspapers published in Norway
Norwegian-language newspapers
Finnøy
Mass media in Rogaland
Publications established in 1999
1999 establishments in Norway
Nynorsk